Ajax: Hark the Herald Angels Sing is a football documentary that goes behind the scenes at Ajax Amsterdam football club during the 1999/2000 season. It was sanctioned by the club as they were expecting a successful season but it was one of the worst seasons suffered by Ajax in recent history and the DVD did not show Ajax in good light. The documentary shows footage of the board room and meetings as well as the team's football camp in Ghana.

Cast
Danny Blind
Cristian Chivu
Bobby Haarms
Hans Westerhof
Jan Wouters
Richard Witschge
Nikos Machlas

The following people also appeared whilst studying at the Ajax Academy.
Gregory van der Wiel
Mitchell Donald
Jeffrey Sarpong
Donovan Slijngard
Nordin Amrabat
Evander Sno
Jeremain Lens
Johnny Heitinga

External links

Ajax - Hark The Herald Angels Sings at International Documentary Film Festival Amsterdam.

References 

AFC Ajax
Documentary films about association football
2000 films
2000 documentary films
2000s Dutch-language films
Dutch documentary films
Dutch association football films